Tibbee, also known as Tibbee Station, is an unincorporated community located in Clay County, Mississippi, United States.

The community was named after Tibbee Creek. Tibbee is located on the former Gulf, Mobile and Ohio Railroad. Tibbee was once home to five stores and a school. The one-room schoolhouse was first built in 1861 and has since been restored.

A post office operated under the name Tibbee Station from 1858 to 1937.

References

Unincorporated communities in Clay County, Mississippi
Unincorporated communities in Mississippi
Mississippi placenames of Native American origin